Eddie Barry (October 25, 1887 – August 28, 1966) was an American film actor. He appeared in more than 100 films between 1912 and 1930. He was born in Philadelphia, Pennsylvania, and died in Newquay, England. He was the older brother of fellow actor Neal Burns.

Selected filmography
 Clean Sweep (1918)
 Business Before Honesty (1918)
 A Roman Scandal (1919)
 Her Bridal Nightmare (1920)
 A Bashful Bigamist (1920)
 Crack o' Dawn (1925)
 The Sagebrush Lady (1925)
 Reckless Courage (1925)
 Fighting Luck (1925)
 Red Blood (1925)
 Nifty Numbers (1928)

References

External links

1887 births
1966 deaths
20th-century American male actors
American male film actors
American male silent film actors
Male actors from Philadelphia